The Diocese of Clonmacnoise can refer to:
The Roman Catholic diocese of Clonmacnoise is now incorporated the Roman Catholic Diocese of Ardagh and Clonmacnoise
The Church of Ireland diocese of Clonmacnoise is now incorporated within the united Diocese of Meath and Kildare

See also
The Bishop of Clonmacnoise

Former Church of Ireland dioceses in Ireland
Former Roman Catholic dioceses in Ireland